National Tom Sawyer Days also known as the National Tom Sawyer Days Carnival takes place in Hannibal, Missouri every year over the July 4 weekend. The festival includes contests from Mark Twain novels along with a parade, fireworks and a  run.

History

National Tom Sawyer Days is a yearly event which takes place on July 4 and it is organized by the Hannibal Jaycees in Hannibal, Missouri; it began in 1956. The event is held on the banks of the Mississippi river in downtown Hannibal. Mark Twain was raised in Hannibal, Missouri, which provided the setting for his novels about Tom Sawyer and Huckleberry Finn. In 1959 a joint proclamation by the mayor, as well as the governors of Illinois and Missouri, moved the holiday to July 4. In 2022 Hannibal hosted the 67th annual National Tom Sawyer Days: the festival ran from June 18 through the Fourth of July 2022. The 2022 festival began on June 18 in the with two pageants in the Tanyard Gardens: Beautiful Baby and Little Mister/Miss Hannibal.

Events
Events at the fair include, frog jumping, fence painting, and a "Tom and Becky" look alike contest. Other events include a  run, a fourth of July parade and fireworks. There is a tricycling race on East Broadway Street, running along the river. Contestants wear numbered paper plates on their backs.

In 1993 Competitors participated in a "Mud Volleyball Tournament" while the Mississippi River was 12 feet over flood level. There is also a Mark Twain impersonator, wearing all white, leading a parade down Broadway.

See also
 Mark Twain Boyhood Home & Museum
 Mark Twain Cave

References

External links
2022 National Tom Sawyer Days events 

Hannibal, Missouri
July events
Mark Twain
Independence Day (United States) festivals